Gudme-hallerne is a complex of indoor sports arenas in the town of Gudme on Funen, Denmark. The arena is primarily used for handball, and is home to as well the men's Danish Handball League team GOG, and the women's 1st Division team.

Handball venues in Denmark
Indoor arenas in Denmark
Sports venues in the Region of Southern Denmark
Buildings and structures in Svendborg Municipality
Sports complexes